Sir John David Rees, 1st Baronet,  (16 December 1854 – 2 June 1922) was a colonial administrator in British India and subsequently a Member of Parliament at Westminster.

Biography
He was educated at Cheltenham College and joined the Indian Civil Service in 1875. He served mostly in the south of India where he was Under-Secretary in the Madras Government, and later the British Resident in Travancore and Cochin. He also served as an Additional Member of the Governor-General's Council in the 1890s.

In 1901, Rees retired from the Civil Service. He was an active proponent of the Raj and wrote a number of books on British India. The Real India, first published in 1908, went through a number of editions. In 1902, he had even contributed a number of columns to the Times Literary Supplement on Indian matters.

Parliament 
He served two terms as Member of Parliament (MP): from 1906 to 1910 as the Liberal MP for Montgomery constituency, and from 1912 to 1922 as the Unionist MP for Nottingham East.

Family 
He married Mary Catherine Dormer in 1891, and was created a baronet on 8 May 1919. Lady Rees was a correspondent of George Orwell.

Their daughter Rosemary Rees, later Lady du Cros (1901-1994) was an aviator and one of the first eight female pilots appointed to the Air Transport Auxiliary during the Second World War. She was also a qualified flight instructor and was one of the few pilots to receive an MBE for her work in this field.

He was succeeded in the baronetcy by his son, Richard Rees, the inspiration for Ravelston in Orwell's Keep The Aspidistra Flying.

Selected works
 Tours in India
 The Mahommedans
 The Real India
 Modern India
 Current Political Problems

Arms

References

External links 
 

1854 births
1922 deaths
Liberal Party (UK) MPs for Welsh constituencies
Indian Civil Service (British India) officers
Conservative Party (UK) MPs for English constituencies
UK MPs 1906–1910
UK MPs 1910
UK MPs 1910–1918
UK MPs 1918–1922
Rees, John, 1st Baronet
Commanders of the Royal Victorian Order
Knights Commander of the Order of the Indian Empire
People educated at Cheltenham College
British non-fiction writers